Harheim is a borough (Ortsbezirk) of Frankfurt am Main, Germany.

It is a possible birthplace of the Minnesinger Bernger von Horheim.

References

Districts of Frankfurt